The Marquessate of Barboles is a Spanish nobility title created by King Philip IV, on March 20 of 1647, in favor of Juan Ximénez-Cerdán and Fernández de Heredia, that belonged to the house of Juan Ximénez de Cerdán (1355–1435). It is associated with the Zaragoza town of Bárboles. The XIV Marchioness María del Pilar Benítez y Guadarrama succeeded to the marquisate in 1986 with grandeship of Spain after 1987.

References

Spanish noble titles
Marquesses of Spain